The music of the Norwegian composer Edvard Grieg has been used extensively in media, music education, and popular music.

Music education
In 1993, Norway organized a celebration for the 150th anniversary of Grieg's birth, entitled "Grieg in the Schools", which included programs for children from pre-school to secondary school. The programs were repeated in 1996 in Germany, and were called Grieg in der Schule, in which over a thousand students participated. There were Grieg observances in 39 countries, from Mexico to Russia.

Further celebrations of Grieg and his music were held in 2007, the 100th anniversary of his death. Bosnia and Herzegovina held a large-scale celebration, featuring Peer Gynt and the Piano Concerto in a public concert for children and adults. The July 2007 Australasian Piano Pedagogy Conference featured Grieg's works.

The Bergen University College, and, later, the University of Bergen both named their tertiary music departments  (the Grieg Academy), in honor of Grieg.

References to Grieg's music in popular culture

Peer Gynt

In 1960 Duke Ellington recorded a jazz interpretation of Peer Gynt in his Swinging Suites by Edward E. and Edward G. album. A struggle ensued in Norway between the Grieg Foundation and its supporters, who found the recordings offensive to Norwegian culture, and Norwegian supporters of Ellington. Ellington's versions were withdrawn from distribution in the country until 1967, when Grieg's copyrights expired.

"In the Hall of the Mountain King"

Music
Possibly, the first jazz rendition of "In the Hall of the Mountain King" was made by Alvino Rey in 1941. Rey also recorded a version of "Anitra's Dance". American bass trombonist George Roberts recorded a jazz rendition of the song, which appeared on his 1959 album Meet Mr. Roberts, as the first song, entitled "In the Hall of the Mountain King".

Hugo Montenegro led off his 1960 Bongos and Brass album with a sped-up and energized version, which was used as the arrangement that many Drum Corps International drum corps used as a basis for their performances of the classical song for decades to come.

Nero & the Gladiators had a No. 48 hit of the same title on the British charts in 1961.

The British comedy music duo Flanders and Swann used the melody of "Mountain King" in part of their song "Food for Thought," in their stage show At the Drop of Another Hat (recording issued 1964).

A heavy rock version of the song appears on the album Big Brother & the Holding Company: Live in San Francisco 1966 by the American rock band Big Brother and the Holding Company, although it was actually recorded at television station KQED in San Francisco on April 25, 1967.

British rock band The Who recorded a performance of "In the Hall of the Mountain King" in 1967. This version went unreleased until 1995, when it appeared as a bonus track on a CD reissue of The Who Sell Out. Tucson Weekly has called this cover a "Who-freakout arrangement" One reviewer called The Who's version the "weirdest of these" covers on the CD, and says it is "a rendition of the corresponding extract from Grieg's Peer Gynt suite ... [yet] it hardly sounds like Grieg here, anyway..." Another says that "the main function of the composition is to evoke thoughts of (naturally) King Crimson and (unnaturally) Pink Floyd, because in parts it sounds exactly like 'Interstellar Overdrive'."

Electric Light Orchestra recorded a 6:37 long version of "In the Hall of the Mountain King" in 1973, as the concluding selection of their album On the Third Day, and performed it with Great Balls of Fire in 1974, for their live album The Night the Light Went On in Long Beach.

Rick Wakeman's 1974 symphonic rock poem Journey to the Centre of the Earth features the "Hall of the Mountain King" theme near the end of the piece.

In 1974, The Wombles produced their own lively version, "The Hall of the Mountain Womble", on their third album Keep On Wombling. The album spent six weeks in the UK album charts, peaking at number 17.

British rock band Marillion included the main melody of "In the Hall of the Mountain King" in a live version of "Margaret" found on the B-side of their "Garden Party" single, and also on the B-sides compilation album B'Sides Themselves. The song was recorded at Edinburgh Playhouse, April 7, 1983.

American metal band Savatage's song "Prelude to Madness" is an arrangement of Grieg's "In the Hall of the Mountain King". It is included on their 1987 album Hall of the Mountain King which also includes a song of the same name, but which is an original composition.

German metal band Helloween's song "Gorgar" contains a partition from Grieg's "In the Hall of the Mountain King". The song can be found in band's 1985 album, Walls of Jericho.

The music of Foetus's song "Enter the Exterminator", from his 1985 album Nail, is based on Grieg's "In the Hall of the Mountain King".

Ritchie Blackmore's Rainbow's 1995 album, Stranger in Us All, includes a rendition of the theme titled "Hall of the Mountain King". The lyrics reimagine the main character as the king taking revenge on another for "taking the innocence" of an unspecified woman.

Dutch producer Patrick van Kerckhoven released the single "Ruffneck rules da artcore scene!!!" in 1996, borrowing the melody of "In the Hall of the Mountain King"; the record reached number eight in the Dutch top 40.

The Canadian rock band Saga includes a performance of the song, titled "In the Hall of the Mountain King William", on their live album Detours recorded in 1997.

German Eurodance group Captain Jack's 1999 track "Dream a Dream" samples from "In the Hall of the Mountain King". It was included in the 2000 arcade game Dance Dance Revolution 4thMix.

Finnish symphonic metal band Apocalyptica covered "In the Hall of the Mountain King" on their 2000 album Cult.

Dutch symphonic metal band Epica performed a rendition of "In the Hall of the Mountain King" with the Extended Reményi Ede Chamber Orchestra at the Miskolc Opera Festival, for their 2009 live album The Classical Conspiracy.

Trent Reznor and Atticus Ross included an electronic version of "In the Hall of the Mountain King" in their score to the 2010 film The Social Network, accompanying a scene where the Winklevoss twins compete in a crew match.

K-Pop band SF9 included the main melody of "In the Hall of the Mountain King" in their song "Jungle Game" from their 2017 extended play album Burning Sensation.

American Rapper Dax sampled the Melody for Christmas Hip-Hop Song "Grinch"

In late October 2017, black MIDI creator "Sir Spork" created a rendition of "In the Hall of the Mountain King" that contained 2.9 million notes and amassed over 31 million views on YouTube.

Jpop duo W uses the main melody of "In the Hall of the Mountain King" during the verses and musical interlude of their song "Choi Waru Devil", the lead track from their 2019 EP of the same name.

In 2019, Slot game provider Quickspin released a game called "Hall of the Mountain King" that is entirely based on the piece "In the Hall of the Mountain King" and where the melody of the same tune is used throughout the game. Also arrangements of "Aase's Death" and "Solveig's Song" can be heard on the opening screen and in win celebrations respectively.

EDM artist Timmy Trumpet and singer Vitas collaborated in 2020 on "The King", a non-album single that reprises the Grieg tune.

American punk-rock band The Offspring recorded a version of "In the Hall of the Mountain King" on their 2021 album Let the Bad Times Roll.

Brazilian funk singer MC Livinho has made the song "ela é espetacular" based on the rhythm of "In the Hall of the Mountain King" adding a brazilian funk beat and a such different lyrics, the song is very popular in Brazil and played normally in funk parties.

Film and TV
D. W. Griffith's The Birth of a Nation (1915) uses the song to build up to the Union attack on Atlanta. The song had by that time already been used in film scores, whether for Ibsen's play or other works; yet the popularity of Griffith's film helped to establish it in the American popular imagination.

"In the Hall of the Mountain King" plays a major plot point in Fritz Lang's early sound film M (1931). Peter Lorre's character of child killer Hans Beckert whistles the tune whenever he is overcome with the urge to commit murder. However, Lorre himself could not whistle – it is actually Lang who is heard. The film was one of the first to use a leitmotif, associating "In the Hall of the Mountain King" with the Lorre character. Later in the film, the mere sound of the song lets the audience know that he is nearby, off-screen. This association of a musical theme with a particular character or situation, a technique borrowed from opera, became a staple in film.

The theme music to the 1983 television series Inspector Gadget was inspired by "In the Hall of the Mountain King".

The song is frequently used as incidental music in the animated, 1988–1994 TV show Garfield and Friends.

The melody was featured in a 1990 commercial for Ritz Bits Cheese Sandwiches.

In the 1993 film Needful Things, based on the novel by Stephen King, the song is used when Nettie Cobb (Amanda Plummer) breaks into the home of Danforth Keeton (J.T. Walsh) to plant a phony letter accusing him of embezzlement.

In the 1993 animated series Adventures of Sonic the Hedgehog, "In the Hall of the Mountain King" is sampled as part of the show's opening theme alongside "Flight of the Bumblebee" and the theme from the original Sonic the Hedgehog video game. The tune also serves as a leitmotif for antagonists Scratch and Grounder.

In 2001, the song was used in the film Rat Race as the characters Duane and Blaine destroy the airport radar.

In 2004, Pete sings "Petey, King of France", the song was originally written "In the Hall of the Mountain King",
from the direct-to-video film Mickey, Donald, Goofy: The Three Musketeers.

In 2010, a remixed version appeared in the soundtrack of the film The Social Network. 

In 2011, it played in the background of the sixteenth episode of the seventh season of the TV series House M.D., while the titular character, Dr. Gregory House played a prank on his hotel room attendant Carnell. 

A trap version of the song, titled "Hair Up" is featured in the film Trolls, 2016.

Knight of Cups, 2015, uses "Solveig's Song" and "Death of Aase" on multiple occasions.

A post-credits scene in Johnny English Reborn uses the piece while Johnny English prepares a dinner.

In the 2014 Cartoon Network animated series Total Drama All-Stars, Mike’s malevolent alternate personality, Mal, can be heard whistling a phrase from “In the Hall of the Mountain King”.

In the 2016 Netflix cartoon Trollhunters, by Guillermo del Toro, the tune is associated with the villainous Zelda Nomura, playing during fight scenes between her and the hero, and others scenes in the land of darkness. Nomura claims in a second-season episode (the fourth) that it has been her favorite song since she attended the premier of Peer Gynt.

Season 2, Episode 12 of the American television series Mad Men, 2017, is titled "The Mountain King". A young boy haltingly plays the piece on the piano as Don Draper watches, and Don comments, "It's scary." The song sets a mood of fear and trouble for the episode, which involves Don disappearing from his job and wandering in the strange land of Southern California in 1962.

In the 2020 Animaniacs reboot, "In the Hall of the Mountain King" is used in the show.

In this 2022's The Bob's Burgers Movie, this song is used as commercial on Hulu.

Video games
This song is used as the opening music for the TI-99/4A version of Hunt the Wumpus, 1973.

A few bars of "In the Hall of the Mountain King" are played when entering the final cave in the 1982 video game Dragonstomper.

The first level of the 1983 video game Manic Miner (Central Cavern) uses the song as background music.

The 1983 video game Mountain King uses the theme as background music throughout.

The 1989 video game Midnight Rescue! used this song when players would enter a room. 

Anitra's Dance is featured in Quest for Glory: Shadows of Darkness, released in 1993.

The 1995 video game Return Fire uses the theme while driving in the Armored Support Vehicle.

The 1996 video game Privateer 2: The Darkening uses the theme during some space trips and battles.

The 1997 game compilation Sonic Jam features an animated short, "Sonic: Man of the Year", which is partially set to "Morning Mood" and "In the Hall of the Mountain King".

The 2011 video game Pump It Up Fiesta EX contains an arrangement by BanYa Production titled "The Devil".

It is later given an 8-bit remix with Beethoven's 9th Symphony, the fourth movement in particular, in Just Dance 2018, with the title "In the Hall of the Pixel King". It was supposed to be in its predecessor, Just Dance 2017, but was scrapped for unknown reasons.

In the final challenge of the 2016 video game The Witness, "Anitra's Dance" and "In the Hall of the Mountain King" were used as auditory cues to indicate the amount of time the player has left to solve a series of timed puzzles.

The 2017 video game The End is Nigh uses a remix of the song throughout the "Ruin" area.

In the 2018 game Forza Horizon 4, the song appears on the classic music channel on the radio.

In 2020, the song appears in the Minecraft 1.16 trailer.

Theme and Amusement parks
The British theme park Alton Towers have repeatedly used the theme "In the Hall of the Mountain King" since 1992 with the opening of the Runaway Mine Train and the Haunted House as a central musical identity to the park. The main theme is present in nearly all of the park's music and is often the most common association of the theme.

"Morning"

Jay and the Americans recorded a rock and roll cover song known as "Dawning", in 1962. "Morning" was later used in the 1973 film Soylent Green as part of the music selected by Edward G. Robinson's character to listen to as he lay dying.

In 1998, The Simpsons episode "Bart Carny" paid homage to its use in older cartoons in a sequence where a cheeseburger unwraps in the early sunlight. Later in the same year, German musical project In-Mood feat. Juliette sampled the theme for their song "Ocean of Light."

The "Morning Mood" theme in the first movement of Grieg’s Peer Gynt Suite no 1, Op 46 is used as the opening theme music in PopCap Games' 2007 video game Peggle, accompanying the animation of a rising sun.

The song plays in an episode of Pop Team Epic, when Popuko wakes up. However, upon seeing it is still nighttime, she beats up the song caption.

The song plays during the reveal trailer for the character Kled for the videogame League of Legends, called "Kled: The Reunion".

The beginning portion was also used in a Cartoon Network sign-on from 2013 to 2015, where the titular character from one of CN's shows, Uncle Grandpa, appears with his head rising against a mountain range background, saying his trademark catchphrase, "Good morning!". In the sign-off, the character would say the catchphrase, and lower back down with the music playing (albeit reversed) and then him saying the catchphrase again.

"Solveig's Song"
"Solveig's Song" from Peer Gynt (Grieg) is used as the melodic basis for a track in Vandal Hearts 2, 1999.

Power metal/Progressive metal band Kamelot based a song called "Forever" on the melody of "Solveig's Song". This is also mentioned by their now previous singer Roy Khan, on their live DVD One Cold Winters Night.

Piano Sonata
The motion picture The First Legion uses Grieg's Piano Sonata in E minor as a way to introduce a Jesuit priest's prayer. The priest, Father Fulton, plays the sonata as a way of connecting himself to the other Jesuits, when "forced to revise their standards of belief after experiencing first a makeshift and later a 'real' miracle."

"Brothers, Sing On!"
The folk song "Brothers, Sing On!" ("Sangerhilsen" in the original Norwegian) was written by Grieg, with lyrics by Sigvald Skavlan and with English language lyrics by Herbert Dalmas and/or Howard McKinney. The Mohawk-Hudson Male Chorus Association (MHMCA) presented a massed concert, with 90 male singers, at the historic Troy Savings Bank Music Hall on May 3, 2008, entitled "Brothers, Sing On!", with the titular song, which was also adopted as the organization's theme song in 1974. They had previously performed the same song in the same venue in 2002.

The University of Northern Iowa has gone so far as to name its web site and to start every concert with this song:

Other pieces
The 1944 musical Song of Norway, based very loosely on Grieg's life and using his music, was created in 1944 by Robert Wright and George Forrest; and a film version was released in 1970.

The 1957 made-for-TV movie musical The Pied Piper of Hamelin uses Grieg's music almost exclusively, with "In the Hall of the Mountain King" being the melody that the Piper (Van Johnson) plays to rid the town of rats.

The opening theme of the first movement of Grieg's Piano Concerto in A Minor was used by Jimmy Wisner, recording under the name "Kokomo", in the song "Asia Minor", a top-ten pop hit in the U.S. in 1961.

Eric Morecambe famously played "all the right notes, just not necessarily in the right order" of Grieg's Piano Concerto in a sketch on the 1971 Morecambe and Wise Christmas special that featured Andre Previn.

In the 1970s, spiritualist Rosemary Brown claimed that the deceased Grieg had dictated a musical composition to her.

Adagio (Piano Concerto in A Minor, Op. 16) 
The 2018 motion picture  Red Sparrow used this concerto as the theme for Dominika Egorova's relationship with the CIA agent Nate Nash. He later telephones her and, without speaking, plays the concerto over the phone.

See also
 List of compositions by Edvard Grieg
 Neo-Medieval
 Grieg Academy

References

 
Music in popular culture